Paduka Sri Sultan Sulaiman Shah I ibni al-Marhum Sultan Ibrahim Shah (died 2 August 1423) was the seventh Sultan of Kedah. His reign was from 1373 to 1423. His reign saw an invasion from Samudera Pasai that conquered a few cities in Kedah.

External links
 List of Sultans of Kedah

1423 deaths
14th-century Sultans of Kedah
15th-century Sultans of Kedah